Hans Christoph Becker-Foss (born 1949 in  Höxter) is a German conductor, organist and harpsichordist and professor at the Hochschule für Musik und Theater Hannover.

Biography
Becker-Foss studied church music in Bremen. From 1973 to 1979 he was director of the Hastedter Kantorei in Bremen. Since 1993 he has been director of the Göttinger Vokalensemble. With the NDR Radiophilharmonie and the NDR Sinfonieorchester, Jenaer Philharmonie, the Staatsorchester Rheinische Philharmonie Koblenz, the Prague Symphony Orchestra, the Folkwang Kammerorchester Essen among others. Becker-Foss has contributed to many performances of Schubert, Mendelssohn, Schumann, Brahms and Mahler and has conducted the Capella Classica in works of Mozart, Beethoven, Haydn and Schubert. Since 1980 he has been a lecturer of organ and early music at the Hochschule für Musik und Theater Hannover, appointed professor in 1993. Essentially a specialist for Baroque organ music, he has performed the works of Dieterich Buxtehude, Couperin and Bach. He is a recipient of the Preis der deutschen Schallplattenkritik in 2001.

References

External links

1949 births
Living people
People from Höxter
German male conductors (music)
German organists
German male organists
German harpsichordists
German music educators
Academic staff of the Hochschule für Musik, Theater und Medien Hannover
21st-century German conductors (music)
21st-century organists
21st-century German male musicians